The unicameral National People's Assembly is Guinea-Bissau's legislative body.

The Assembly has a total of 102 seats, with all 102 members being elected.

Previous National People's Assembly election results

See also
History of Guinea-Bissau
Politics of Guinea-Bissau
List of presidents of the National People's Assembly of Guinea-Bissau

References

External links
 

Politics of Guinea-Bissau
Political organisations based in Guinea-Bissau
Government of Guinea-Bissau
Guinea-Bissau
Guinea-Bissau
Buildings and structures in Bissau
1973 establishments in Portuguese Guinea